The ONCE Group was a collection of musicians, visual artists, architects, and film-makers who wished to create an environment in which artists could explore and share techniques and ideas in the late 1950s and early 1960s. The group was responsible for hosting the ONCE Festival of New Music in Ann Arbor, Michigan, between 1961 and 1966. It was founded by Ann Arborites Robert Ashley, George Cacioppo, Gordon Mumma, Roger Reynolds and Donald Scavarda.

During the years the festival was active, a number of avant-garde composers’ works were performed along with performances in dance, jazz (Eric Dolphy) and rock and roll. Composers represented include: Robert Ashley, Pauline Oliveros, David Behrman, George Cacioppo, George Crevoshay, Donald Scavarda, Roger Reynolds, Gordon Mumma, Meredith Monk, Bruce Wise, Robert Sheff (a.k.a. 'Blue' Gene Tyranny), and Philip Krumm.  The musical compositions and works in dance and avant-garde performance art pushed the limits of then current artistic endeavour and inclusiveness well beyond their limits. The festival served as a laboratory for the development of new approaches in both acoustic and electronic music as well as dance, film and multi-media performance.

In November 2010, the University Musical Society and University of Michigan School of Music, Theatre & Dance collaborated to present a multi-day festival celebrating the 50th anniversary of the ONCE Group, entitled ONCE.MORE. ONCE.MORE was organized by Michael Daugherty, who was the chair of composition department of the  University of Michigan School of Music, Theatre & Dance at the time and also a former composition student of Roger Reynolds at Yale during 1981.

Further reading 
Cohen, Milton.  “Space Theatre,” from Dimension No. 14, 1963.  University of Michigan Bentley Historical Library.
Hitchcock, H. Wiley.  “The Current Chronicle,” from Musical Quarterly, Vol. 48, No. 2, 1962.  Oxford University Press.
James, Richard.  “ONCE: Microcosm of the 1960s Musical and Multimedia Avant-Garde,” from American Music, Vol. 5, No. 4.  Chicago: University of Illinois Press, 1987.
Kasemets, Udo.  “The Current Chronicle,” from Musical Quarterly, Vol. 50, No. 4, 1964.  Oxford University Press.
Miller, Leta.  ONCE and Again: The Evolution of a Legendary Festival, from the CD Box Set Music from the ONCE Festival 1961–1966.  New York: New World Records CD 80567-2, 2003.
Mumma, Gordon.  “The ONCE Festival and How It Happened,” Arts in Society, Vol. 4, No. 2, 1967, Madison, WI.  Revised by Gordon Mumma 2008.  Copyright 2008 by Gordon Mumma.
Reynolds, Roger.  Preface to score publication from Generation, Vol. 15, unmarked number, 1963.  University of Michigan Bentley Historical Library.
Sheff, Robert and Mark Slobin.  “Music Beyond the Boundaries,” from Generation, Vol. 17, No. 2, 1965.  University of Michigan Bentley Historical Library.
Weingarten, Emily.  The Music of ONCE: Perpetual Innovation.  July 2008.

See also
List of electronic music festivals
Live electronic music

References

External links 
Jacobson, Mark. "ONCE.MORE 50th Anniversary Festival Guide". November 2, 2010
Lelievre, Roger. "ONCE upon a time in Ann Arbor." The Ann Arbor News.  Sunday, April 29, 2007
Tai, Paul.  Liner notes for Music from the ONCE Festival:   1961-1966.  New World Records 80567.
Baise, Greg. "ONCE again" "the metrotimes". Wednesday, October 27, 2010
Stryker, Mark. "ONCE concerts blend '60s and today". "Detroit Free-Press". Thursday, October 28, 2010
Firant, Laurel. "ONCE upon a time in Ann Arbor: Festival revisits groundbreaking music movement" "annarbor.com". Friday, October 29, 2010

American artist groups and collectives